The Duchy of Greater Poland was a district principality in Greater Poland that was a fiefdom of the Kingdom of Poland. It was formed in 1138 from the territories of the Kingdom of Poland, following its fragmentation started by the testament of Bolesław III Wrymouth. In 1177, the state broke had separated into the duchies of Poznań, Gniezno and Kalisz, and united again in 1279, lasting in that form until 1320, when it was incorporated back into the Kingdom of Poland. Its capital was Poznań.

History

Upon the death of Polish Piast duke Bolesław III Wrymouth in 1138, his country was divided by his will into 4-5 hereditary provinces distributed among his sons. The late duke had also established the Seniorate Province of Kraków for the eldest Władysław II, designated high duke of whole Poland.

Mieszko the Old
As one of these provinces, Greater Poland was given to Mieszko III the Old, the third son of late Duke Bolesław. 
Duke Mieszko III the Old at first ruled over the western part of the Greater Polish lands at Poznań. His dominion bordered on the Polish Duchy of Silesia in the south, on the Seniorate Province in the east and on the Pomeranian lands in the north. In the west the Greater Polish lands stretched up to Lubusz Land on the western Polish border, where in 1157 the Ascanian count Albert the Bear established the Imperial Margraviate of Brandenburg.

After the death of his Mieszko's brother Bolesław IV the Curly in 1173, he also became High Duke of Poland according to the principle of agnatic seniority as laid down in Bolesław's testament. However, he soon had to face a rebellion at Kraków instigated by Lesser Polish magnates led by his younger brother Casimir II the Just with the support of Mieszko's own son Odon fearing for his heritage. Casimir assumed the high ducal title, while in 1179 Odon even expelled his father from the Greater Polish lands. Mieszko fled to the Duchy of Pomerania at the court of Duke Bogislaw I, husband of his daughter Anastasia.

With support by Pomeranian forces, Mieszko in 1181 was able to return to his duchy and also to conquer the adjacent lands of Gniezno and Kalisz, formerly part of the Seniorate Province. Odon was forced to leave Poznań and only retained a small strip of land south of the Obra river. While Mieszko's subsequent attempts to regain the high ducal title failed, in 1186 he was able to further expand his duchy by the adjacent lands of Kuyavia up to the Vistula in the east, which had been ruled by his deceased nephew Duke Leszek of Masovia. He gave Kuyavia to his son Bolesław, nevertheless after Bolesław's death in 1195, the lands were again separated from Greater Poland, when Mieszko had to cede Kuyavia to Casimir's son Duke Konrad of Masovia in 1199.

In 1191 Mieszko had finally reconquered Kraków, nevertheless his decision to entrust the rule over Lesser Poland to his son Mieszko the Younger proved to be a failure: Casimir soon regained the Polish throne and Mieszko the Younger fled to his father, who installed him as a duke at Kalisz. When Mieszko the Younger died in 1193, his father reconciled with his eldest son Odon and gave the Duchy of Kalisz to him. Upon the death of Odon in the following year, all Greater Polish lands were re-united under the rule of Mieszko the Old; he ceded late Odon's territories south of the Obra river to his only surviving son Władysław III Spindleshanks. By 1994 Mieszko the Old had outlived his brothers. However, Casimir's son Leszek I the White, like his father, would not acknowledge his rule at Kraków. Upon Mieszko's death in 1202, his son Władysław soon was confronted with the rivaling claims raised by his cousin.

Władysław Spindleshanks and Władysław Odonic

In 1206 Władysław Spindleshanks finally lost the high ducal title to Leszek and furthermore had to deal with his rebellious nephew Władysław Odonic, son of his late brother Odon. Władysław Odonic claimed the lands of Kalisz, which his father had held in 1193/94 and was able to gain the support by the Archbishop of Gniezno, nevertheless his attempts to depose his uncle failed. At least he received Kalisz, backed by the Silesian duke Henry I the Bearded and from 1216 also ruled over the Greater Polish lands south of the Obra, which his father had held until his death in 1994.

In 1217 the conflict again erupted, when Władysław Spindleshanks reconciled with Leszek and Henry and received free rein to expel Władysław Odonic, who fled to the court of Duke Swietopelk II of Pomerelia. However, even with the help of the Pomerelian duke, Władysław Odonic only was able to conquer the Greater Polish lands of Ujście in 1223. In 1227 Swietopelk raided a ducal assembly (wiec) at Gąsawa, whereby High Duke Leszek was killed and Duke Henry the Bearded seriously wounded. Władysław Spindleshanks did not attend the meeting, which probably saved his life. Furthermore, he got rid of his long-time rival Leszek, whom he now could succeed as high duke. Władysław Odonic, accused of involvement in the assault, retired to the Duchy of Masovia, where he forged another alliance with Duke Konrad I. With both Pomerelian and Masovian support he was enabled to take the whole Duchy of Greater Poland from Władysław Spindleshanks in 1229.

Władysław Spindleshanks fled to Silesia and died without issue two years later, whereafter his nephew became the sole heir of the Greater Polish line. Nevertheless, he was confronted by claims raised by the Silesian duke Henry I the Bearded, also Polish high duke from 1232, who from 1234 onwards conquered most of his territories. When Henry I was succeeded by his son Henry II the Pious in 1238, Władysław Odonic was confined to the lands around Ujście. He died in the following year, whereafter High Duke Henry II ruled over all of Greater Poland until he himself was killed at the 1241 Battle of Legnica.

Przemysł I and Bolesław the Pious

The Greater Polish line of the Piasts was continued by the sons of Władysław Odonic, Przemysł I and his minor brother Bolesław the Pious, who first had to reconquer their heritage from the Silesian successors of Henry the Pious. Soon after a conflict arose between the brothers: in 1247 Bolesław openly rebelled against his elder brother with the help of local nobles and the lands were formally divided, whereby the younger received the smaller district of Kalisz. The quarrels continued, as dissatisfied Bolesław also claimed the lands of Gniezno. Przemysł had him deposed and arrested in 1250, and not until 1253, by the agency of the Archbishop of Gniezno, was Bolesław re-installed as Duke of Kalisz and Gniezno. 

Przemysł had to deal with the expansionist policies of the Brandenburg margraves John I and Otto III, who had acquired Lubusz Land at the western border of his duchy from the Silesian duke Bolesław II Rogatka in 1248. When he died in 1257, his brother Bolesław became sole ruler over all Greater Poland. In 1264 Bolesław the Pious passed the Statute of Kalisz which extended Jewish rights in his duchy.

Przemysł II
Greater Poland was once again re-united under the rule of Przemysł's son Przemysł II at Poznań in 1279. In the west, the Brandenburg margraves had made Lubusz Land the nucleus of the New March, where they established the town of Landsberg (present-day Gorzów Wielkopolski) in 1257. Przemysł II was able to encounter the Brandenburg expansion by allying with their opponent Duke Bogislaw IV of Pomerania. He briefly controlled Cracov after the death of Henry IV Probus but soon sold it to the king of Bohemia Wenceslaus II , he also inherited the Pomerelian lands due to a succession agreement with the previous duke Mestwin II and even was crowned King of whole Poland in 1295. However, the Greater Polish line finally became extinct when he was abducted and killed in the following year. His succession was claimed by his Kuyavian cousin Władysław I the Elbow-high, who had to deal with his rivaling Silesian relative Duke Henry III of Głogów due to the fact that Przemysl II made a succession agreement with both of them, while the Brandenburgers finally conquered the strategically important fortress of Santok on the Warta River. In 1300 both Piasts had to renounce in favour of mighty King Wenceslaus II of Bohemia.

Upon the death of King Wenceslaus in 1305, the rivalry continued and after a short period of rule by dukes from various branches of the Piast dynasty, the province finally fell to Władysław, who was crowned King of re-united Poland 1320. The duchy was turned into the Poznań Voivodship and Kalisz Voivodship under the united Polish Crown.

Dukes of Greater Poland

Rulers of all Greater Poland
 1194-1202 Mieszko III the Old, Polish high duke from 1198
 1202–1207 Władysław III Spindleshanks, Polish high duke until 1206 and 1227–1229
 1229–1234 Władysław Odonic
 1238–1241 Henry II the Pious of Silesia, Polish high duke
 1241–1247 Przemysł I and Bolesław the Pious
 1250–1253 Przemysł I
 1257–1277 Bolesław the Pious
 1279–1296 Przemysł II, Polish high duke 1290–1291, King of Poland from 1295
 1296–1300 Władysław I the Elbow-high
 1300–1305 King Wenceslaus II of Bohemia
 1305–1309 Henry III of Głogów
 1309–1312 Przemko II of Głogów, Henry IV the Faithful, John of Ścinawa, Bolesław of Oleśnica, Konrad I of Oleśnica
 from 1314 Władysław I the Elbow-high, King of Poland from 1320.
Turned into the Greater Poland province of the united Kingdom of Poland, divided into the Poznań Voivodship and Kalisz Voivodship.

See also 
History of Poland during the Piast dynasty
List of Polish monarchs
Piast Dynasty
History of Poznań

Notes

References

Further reading 
 Zygmunt Boras, Książęta piastowscy Wielkopolski, Wydawnictwo Poznańskie, Poznań 1983, 
 Oskar Balzer, Genealogia Piastów, Kraków 1895
 K. Dworzaczek, Geneaalogia, part 1–2, Warszawa 1959
Wojciech Górczyk,"Ślady recepcji legend arturiańskich w heraldyce Piastów czerskich i kronikach polskich", Kultura i Historia, Uniwersytet Marii Curie Skłodowskiej w Lublinie,17/2010 ISSN 1642-9826 
 Wojciech Górczyk, "Półksiężyc, orzeł, lew i smok. Uwagi o godłach napieczętnych Piastów" 
 Poczet książąt i królów polskich, Warszawa 1978
  Kronika wielkopolska, przeł. Kazimierz Abgarowicz, wstęp i komentarze oprac. Brygida Kürbisówna, PWN, Warszawa 1965, wyd. 2, Kraków 2010, 

Former countries in Europe
Former monarchies of Europe
Duchies of Poland
History of Poland during the Piast dynasty
12th-century establishments in Poland
14th-century disestablishments in Poland
History of Greater Poland
States and territories established in 1138
States and territories disestablished in 1177
States and territories established in 1279
States and territories disestablished in 1295
States and territories established in 1296
States and territories disestablished in 1320
Fiefdoms of Poland